Springvale is a community in Haldimand County, Ontario, Canada.  It is located approximately 6 km west of Hagersville, near the lands of the Mississaugas of the Credit First Nation.

Communities in Haldimand County